Hallam   is a borough in York County, Pennsylvania, United States. The population was 2,774 at the 2020 census.

History
Before 1736, all parts of Pennsylvania west of the Susquehanna River, including present-day Hallam Borough and the surrounding Hellam Township, were land of the Iroquois.

In October 1736, the Proprietors of Pennsylvania received from the Five Nations deeds for the Susquehanna lands south of the Blue Mountains, including the borough and township.

From 1736 to 1739, the area was under the authority of Hempfield Township in Lancaster County east of the Susquehanna. In 1739, the Provincial Assembly passed a special act to empower Lancaster County to establish townships west of the river. Hellam Township was created and included most of what is now York, Adams and Cumberland counties. Hellam Township was named after Hallamshire, the township in England where Samuel Blunston, the magistrate of Lancaster County, was born.

When Hallam Borough was incorporated in 1902, the town's name was spelled Hallam, the same as the English township.

The Martin Schultz House was listed on the National Register of Historic Places in 1993.

Geography

Hallam is located at  (40.003897, -76.604528). It is a suburb of York, Pennsylvania and is part of the York-Hanover Metropolitan Statistical Area, as well as the York-Hanover-Gettysburg Combined Statistical Area.

Hallam is located within the Kreutz Creek watershed.

Climate
Hallam lies on the cusp of a humid subtropical climate zone and experiences four discernible seasons. In January 1994, Hallam experienced its lowest recorded temperature at -21 °F, while the hottest temperature on record was 105 °F in July 1936.

Demographics

As of the census of 2000, there were 1,532 people, 667 households, and 450 families residing in the borough. The population density was 2,182.5 people per square mile (845.0/km2). There were 713 housing units at an average density of 1,015.7 per square mile (393.3/km2). The racial makeup of the borough was 96.21% White, 1.31% African American, 0.39% Native American, 0.59% Asian, 0.85% from other races, and 0.65% from two or more races. Hispanic or Latino of any race were 1.31% of the population.

There were 667 households, out of which 29.2% had children under the age of 18 living with them, 54.6% were married couples living together, 9.6% had a female householder with no husband present, and 32.4% were non-families. 25.9% of all households were made up of individuals, and 9.4% had someone living alone who was 65 years of age or older. The average household size was 2.30 and the average family size was 2.76.

In the borough the population was spread out, with 22.3% under the age of 18, 8.0% from 18 to 24, 30.8% from 25 to 44, 24.0% from 45 to 64, and 14.9% who were 65 years of age or older. The median age was 37 years. For every 100 females there were 97.9 males. For every 100 females age 18 and over, there were 92.4 males.

The median income for a household in the borough was $42,235, and the median income for a family was $47,552. Males had a median income of $34,773 versus $24,716 for females. The per capita income for the borough was $22,868. About 5.0% of families and 4.6% of the population were below the poverty line, including 5.1% of those under age 18 and 6.7% of those age 65 or over.

Education

The Hallam Borough is served by the Eastern York School District. Students in Hallam go to Kreutz Creek Elementary School if they are in grades K–5, Eastern York Middle School in 6–8, and Eastern York High School in 9–12.

References

Kreutz Creek Valley Preservation Society, "An Early History of Hellam Township"

External links

 Hallam Borough official website

Populated places established in 1770
Boroughs in York County, Pennsylvania
1902 establishments in Pennsylvania